Rawalpindi Arts Council (RAC) is an art gallery and art institution located at Stadium road, Rawalpindi. Institution was established in 1975 by the Government of Punjab. It promotes the culture and heritage of the country, competitions are held in the council. Waqar Ahmed is the director of the RAC.
Rawalpindi arts council is adjacent to Shehbaz Sharif sports complex Rawalpindi. Source Junaid Sultan Producer Ptv News

References

External links 
Official Website of RAC (Rawalpindi Arts Council)

1975 establishments in Pakistan
Arts centres in Pakistan
Art museums and galleries in Pakistan
Music venues in Pakistan
Theatres in Pakistan
Rawalpindi District
Arts organisations based in Pakistan